This is a list of American animated television programs created for their first run in broadcast syndication.

Timeline

1940s–1950s

Crusader Rabbit (August 1, 1950 – December 1, 1959) (the first produced animated television series)
Adventures of Pow Wow (January 30 – November 20, 1949)
The Adventures of Paddy the Pelican (September 11 – October 13, 1950)
Colonel Bleep (1956–1960) (the first animated series made and filmed in color)
The Huckleberry Hound Show (September 29, 1958 – December 1, 1961)
Bozo: The World's Most Famous Clown (1958–1962)
The Adventures of Spunky and Tadpole (September 6, 1958 – September 9, 1961)
Bucky and Pepito (September 8, 1959 – March 22, 1960)
The Space Explorers (1959)
Clutch Cargo (March 9, 1959 – 1960)
The Quick Draw McGraw Show (January 1, 1959 – October 20, 1961)
New Adventures of the Space Explorers (1959)
Hergé's Adventures of Tintin (1957–1964)
Capt'n Sailorbird (1959)

1960s
Mel-O-Toons (1959–1960)
The Gumby Show (January 1, 1960 – July 9, 1968) (Season 2 only)
The New Adventures of Pinocchio (1960–1961)
Courageous Cat and Minute Mouse (September 14, 1960 – November 30, 1962)
Popeye the Sailor (June 10, 1960 – April 23, 1963)
Mister Magoo (November 7, 1960 – February 2, 1962)
Q.T. Hush (September 24, 1960 – February 8, 1961)
The Nutty Squirrels Present (1960–1961)
The Dick Tracy Show (January 1, 1961 – January 1, 1962)
The Underseas Explorers (1961)
The Yogi Bear Show (January 30, 1961 – January 6, 1962)
Tales of the Wizard of Oz (September 2, 1961 – December 1961)
Space Angel (1962–1964)
Out of the Inkwell (August 6, 1962 – November 4, 1963)
The Hanna-Barbera New Cartoon Series (September 3, 1962 – August 26, 1963)
The Deputy Dawg Show (1962–1972)
King Features Trilogy (1962–1964)
Beetle Bailey (1962–1964)
Barney Google and Snuffy Smith (1962–1964)
Krazy Kat (1962–1964)
The Funny Company (1963)
Rod Rocket (1963)
Astro Boy (September 7, 1963 – August 20, 1965)
The Mighty Hercules (September 1, 1963 – May 1, 1966)
The Magilla Gorilla Show (January 15, 1964 – December 30, 1967)
The Peter Potamus Show (September 16, 1964 – October 23, 1965)
The New 3 Stooges (1965–1966)
8th Man (1965–1966)
Sinbad Jr. and his Magic Belt (September 11, 1965 – May 28, 1966)
JOT (1965–1981)
The Mighty Mr. Titan (1965)
Roger Ramjet (September 11, 1965 – October 31, 1965)
The Astronut Show (1965–1967)
Gigantor (January 1966 – 1967)
Rocket Robin Hood (1966–1969)
Arthur! and the Square Knights of the Round Table (1966–1968)
Kimba the White Lion (September 1966 – 1977)
Laurel and Hardy (September 10, 1966 – March 25, 1967)
DoDo, The Kid from Outer Space (1965–1970)
The Marvel Super Heroes (September 1 – December 1, 1966)
Batfink (April 21, 1966 – October 4, 1967)
Marine Boy (1966–1967)
Prince Planet (1967–1968)
Johnny Cypher in Dimension Zero (March 15, 1967 – September 6, 1968)
Max, the 2000-Year-Old Mouse (1967)
The Amazing 3 (1967)
Speed Racer (1967–1968)
Spider-Man (March 22 –  June 14, 1970) (Season 3 only)
Yogi Bear & Friends (1967–1968)
The Abbott and Costello Cartoon Show (September 9, 1967 – June 1, 1968)
Winky Dink and You (1969–1973) (color revival series to the CBS live-action/animation TV series of the same name)

1970s
Festival of Family Classics (January 1, 1972 – November 26, 1973)
Wait Till Your Father Gets Home (September 12, 1972 – October 8, 1974)
The Wonderful Stories of Professor Kitzel (1972)
A Christmas Story (December 9, 1972) (television special)
Fred Flintstone and Friends (October 3, 1977 – September 1, 1978)
 Tales of Magic/Merlin's Cave/World Famous Fairy Tales (1977–1988)
Groovie Goolies (1978–1979)
Hanna–Barbera's World of Super Adventure (1978–1984)
Battle of the Planets (September 12, 1978 –May 12, 1980)
Star Blazers (September 17, 1979 – December 4, 1984)

1980s
Force Five (1980–1985)
Yogi's First Christmas (November 22, 1980) (television film)
The Raccoons television specials (December 20, 1980 – November 5, 1983)
The Christmas Raccoons (December 20, 1980)
The Raccoons on Ice (November 21, 1982)
The Raccoons and the Lost Star (November 5, 1983)
Spider-Man (September 12, 1981 – March 30, 1982)
Peter and the Magic Egg (March 23, 1983) (television special)
The Magic of Herself the Elf (July 30, 1983) (television special)
G.I. Joe: A Real American Hero (September 12, 1983 – November 20, 1986)
Inspector Gadget (September 12, 1983 – February 1, 1986)
He-Man and the Masters of the Universe (September 26, 1983 – November 21, 1985)
The Charmkins (October 25, 1983) (television special)
Poochie (1984) (television special)
The Adventures of Fat Albert and the Cosby Kids (September 1, 1984 – August 10, 1985) (final season only)
Heathcliff (September 5, 1984 – January 12, 1988)
Challenge of the GoBots (September 8, 1984 – December 13, 1985)
Voltron (September 10, 1984 – November 18, 1985)
The Transformers (September 17, 1984 – November 11, 1987)
Robotech (March 4 – June 28, 1985)
ThunderCats (September 9, 1985 – September 29, 1989)
Jayce and the Wheeled Warriors (September 9, 1985 – April 27, 1986)
She-Ra: Princess of Power (September 9, 1985 – December 2, 1986)
Care Bears (September 14, 1985 – November 23, 1985)
Sectaurs (September 14 – October 12, 1985)
M.A.S.K. (September 30, 1985 – November 26, 1986)
Robotman & Friends (1985) (television special)
The Pound Puppies (October 26, 1985) (television special) 
Star Fairies (1985) (television special)
Captain Harlock and the Queen of a Thousand Years< (1985–1986)
The Funtastic World of Hanna-Barbera (1985–1994)
Galtar and the Golden Lance (September 2, 1985 – January 20, 1986)
Yogi's Treasure Hunt (September 6, 1985 – March 25, 1988)
Paw Paws (September 15, 1985 – February 2, 1986)
The Jetsons (September 16, 1985 – October 27 12, 1987)
The New Adventures of Jonny Quest (September 14, 1986 – March 1, 1987)
Snorks (1984–1989)
Sky Commanders (July 5 – September 27, 1987)
Fantastic Max (September 17, 1988 – January 21, 1990)
The Further Adventures of SuperTed (January 31 – April 25, 1989)
Paddington Bear (December 2, 1989 – January 21, 1990)
Midnight Patrol: Adventures in the Dream Zone (September 1 – November 24, 1990)
The Adventures of Don Coyote and Sancho Panda (1990)
Young Robin Hood (1991)
The Pirates of Dark Water (1992–1993)
SWAT Kats: The Radical Squadron (1993–1994)
2 Stupid Dogs (1993–1994)
Super Sunday (October 6, 1985 – October 1986)
Jem (October 6, 1985 – May 2, 1988)
Bigfoot and the Muscle Machines (October 6, 1985 – 1986)
Robotix (October 6, 1985 – 1986)
Inhumanoids (September 21 – December 14, 1986)
My Little Pony 'n Friends (September 15, 1986 – September 25, 1987)
My Little Pony (April 14, 1984 – September 23, 1987)
The Glo Friends (September 23, 1986 – March 17, 1987)
Potato Head Kids (September 24, 1986 – February 25, 1987)
MoonDreamers (September 25, 1986 – January 8, 1987)
Kideo TV (1986–1987)
Ulysses 31 (1981–1982)
Rainbow Brite (June 27, 1984 – July 24, 1986)
Popples (September 13, 1986 – July 18, 1987)
Lady Lovely Locks and the Pixietails (1987)
Astro Boy (1986)
The Centurions (April 7 – December 12, 1986)
Ghostbusters (September 8 – December 5, 1986)
SilverHawks (September 8 – December 5, 1986)
Defenders of the Earth (September 8, 1986 – May 1, 1987)
The Adventures of the Galaxy Rangers (September 14 – December 11, 1986)
Karate Kommandos (September 15 – September 19, 1986)
Rambo: The Force of Freedom (September 15 – December 26, 1986)
Dennis the Menace (September 22, 1986 – March 26, 1988)
The Adventures of Teddy Ruxpin (December 24, 1986 – October 23, 1987)
Macron 1 (1986–1987)
Maple Town (April 13 – 24, 1987)
Bionic Six (April 19 – November 12, 1987)
The Comic Strip (September 7 – December 4, 1987)
The Mini-Monsters (1987–1988)
Street Frogs (1987–1988)
Karate Cat (1987–1988)
TigerSharks (1987–1988)
BraveStarr (September 14, 1987 – February 24, 1988)
Dinosaucers (September 14 – December 11, 1987)
Maxie's World (September 14 – October 27, 1987)
Saber Rider and the Star Sheriffs (September 14, 1987 – September 2, 1988)
The Real Ghostbusters (September 15, 1987 – December 10, 1987) (Season 2 only)
Sylvanian Families (September 18 – December 11, 1987)
Starcom: The U.S. Space Force (September 20 – December 13, 1987)
Visionaries: Knights of the Magical Light (September 20 – December 13, 1987)
Hanna-Barbera Superstars 10 (September 20, 1987 – November 20, 1988) (film series)
Yogi's Great Escape (September 20, 1987)
The Jetsons Meet the Flintstones (October 18, 1987)
Scooby-Doo Meets the Boo Brothers (November 15, 1987)
Yogi Bear and the Magical Flight of the Spruce Goose (November 22, 1987)
Top Cat and the Beverly Hills Cats (March 20, 1988)
The Good, the Bad, and Huckleberry Hound (May 15, 1988) 
Rockin' with Judy Jetson (September 18, 1988) 
Scooby-Doo and the Ghoul School (October 16, 1988) 
Scooby-Doo! and the Reluctant Werewolf (November 13, 1988) 
Yogi and the Invasion of the Space Bears (November 20, 1988)
Beverly Hills Teens (September 21 – December 18, 1987)
Spiral Zone (September 21 – December 18, 1987)
 Barbie and the Rockers: Out of this World (September 27, 1987) (television special)
 Barbie and the Sensations: Rockin' Back to Earth (September 27, 1987) (television special)
Teenage Mutant Ninja Turtles (December 14, 1987 – March 29, 1991, moved to CBS in 1990)
The Disney Afternoon (September 10, 1990 – August 29, 1997)
Disney's Adventures of the Gummi Bears (September 10, 1990 – February 22, 1991) (Season 6 only)
DuckTales (September 18, 1987 – November 28, 1990)
Chip 'n Dale: Rescue Rangers (September 18, 1989 – November 19, 1990)
TaleSpin (September 7, 1990 – August 8, 1991)
Darkwing Duck (September 6, 1991 – May 20, 1992)
Goof Troop (1992–1993)
Raw Toonage (1992)
Bonkers (October 11, 1993 – February 23, 1994)
Marsupilami (1993)
Aladdin (1994–1995) (Season 2 only)
Gargoyles (October 24, 1994 – May 15, 1996)
The Shnookums and Meat Funny Cartoon Show (January 2 – March 27, 1995)
Timon & Pumbaa (1995–1999) (Only halves of the first two seasons)
Quack Pack (September 3 – November 28, 1996)
Mighty Ducks: The Animated Series (1996–1997)
101 Dalmatians: The Series (1997–1999) (Season 2 only)
Police Academy (September 10, 1988 – September 2, 1989)
The New Yogi Bear Show (September 12 – November 11, 1988)
Denver, the Last Dinosaur (September 12 – November 22, 1988)
Marvel Action Universe (October 2, 1988 – September 26, 1991)
X-Men: Pryde of the X-Men (September 16, 1989) (pilot)
Dino-Riders (October 1 – December 31, 1988)
RoboCop: The Animated Series (October 1 – December 17, 1988)
COPS (October 5, 1988 – February 20, 1989)
Gumby Adventures (January 9 – December 31, 1988)
Little Golden Book Land (March 24, 1989) (television special)
Vytor: The Starfire Champion (1989)
G.I. Joe: A Real American Hero (September 2, 1989 – January 20, 1992) (sequel to the former 1985–1986 G.I. Joe series)
The Super Mario Bros. Super Show! (September 4 – December 1, 1989)
The Legend of Zelda (aired as part of The Super Mario Bros. Super Show!) (September 8 – December 1, 1989)
Ring Raiders (September 16 – October 14, 1989)

1990s
Dragon Warrior (1990)
Tiny Toon Adventures (1990–1992) (Seasons 1-2 only)
The Power Team (aired as part of Video Power) (1990–1992)
Barnyard Commandos (1990)
Widget (September 29, 1990 – December 12, 1991)
The New Adventures of He-Man (September 10 – December 7, 1990)
Wake, Rattle, and Roll (September 17, 1990 – January 18, 1991)
Cartoon All-Stars to the Rescue (April 21, 1990) (television special)
Mr. Bogus (September 28, 1991 – November 29, 1993)
James Bond Jr. (September 30, 1991 – March 2, 1992)
Bucky O'Hare and the Toad Wars (September 8 – December 1, 1991)
Saban's Adventures of the Little Mermaid (1991)
Battletoads (1992) (failed pilot)
The Adventures of T-Rex (January 6, 1992 – January 23, 1993)
Conan the Adventurer (September 13, 1992 – November 23, 1993)
Stunt Dawgs (September 28, 1992 – June 28, 1993)
Twinkle, the Dream Being (December 5, 1992 – June 25, 1993)
Amazin' Adventures/BKN (1992–2001)
 Saban's Around the World in Eighty Dreams (1992–1993)
 Saban’s Gulliver’s Travels (1992–1993)
 King Arthur and the Knights of Justice (1992–1996)
 Double Dragon (1993–1995)
 Hurricanes (1993–1994)
 Mighty Max (September 1, 1993 – December 2, 1994)
 Street Sharks (September 7, 1994 – May 18, 1997)
 Princess Gwenevere and the Jewel Riders (1995–1997)
 Ultraforce (1995–1996)
 Skysurfer Strike Force (1995–1997)
 Action Man (1995-1996)
 Gadget Boy and Heather (1995-1996)
 Highlander: The Animated Series (1995-1996)
 Captain Simian & the Space Monkeys (1996–1998)
 The Mask: Animated Series (1996–1998)
 Extreme Dinosaurs (September 1 – December 24, 1997)
 Extreme Ghostbusters (September 1 – December 8, 1997)
 Jumanji (1998–1999) (season 3)
 Pocket Dragon Adventures (1998–1999)
 Sonic Underground (1999-2000)
 Monster Rancher (1999–2000)
 Roughnecks: Starship Troopers Chronicles (1999–2000)
 Roswell Conspiracies: Aliens, Myths and Legends (1999–2000)
 Kong: The Animated Series (2000)
Funky Fables Christmas Special (1992)
Adventures of Sonic the Hedgehog (September 6 – December 3, 1993)
Stone Protectors (1993)
Biker Mice from Mars (September 18, 1993 – February 24, 1996)
The Bots Master (1993–1994)
Exosquad (September 18, 1993 – November 3, 1994)
The New Adventures of Speed Racer (September 18 – December 11, 1993)
The Pink Panther (September 13, 1993 – April 12, 1995)
BattleTech: The Animated Series (September 10 – December 10, 1994)
Sgt. Savage and his Screaming Eagles (1994)
Creepy Crawlers (October 4, 1994 – March 30, 1996)
The Marvel Action Hour (September 24, 1994 – February 24, 1996)
Iron Man (September 24, 1994 – February 24, 1996)
Fantastic Four (September 24, 1994 – February 24, 1996)
Mutant League (July 2, 1994 – February 24, 1996)
Phantom 2040 (September 18, 1994 – March 3, 1996)
Oscar's Orchestra (1994–1996)
Mega Man (1994–1996)
Happy Ness: The Secret of the Loch (1995)
Monster Mania (1995)
Sailor Moon (1995)
The Baby Huey Show (1995–1996)
Darkstalkers (1995–1996)
Littlest Pet Shop (1995–1996)
Tenko and the Guardians of the Magic (1995–1996)
The Legend of Sarmoti: Siegfried & Roy (1996)
Richie Rich (1996)
Saban Kids Network (1996–1997)
Samurai Pizza Cats (1996–1997)
Eagle Riders (1996–1997)
The Why Why Family (1996–1997)
Saban's Adventures of Oliver Twist (1996–1998)
Dragon Ball Z (1996–1998) (Seasons 1-2 only) (Saban Entertainment series only)
Bruno the Kid (1996–1997)
Dino Babies (1996–1997)
Dragon Flyz (1996–1997)
Flash Gordon (1996–1997)
Power Block (1996–1997)
G.I. Joe Extreme (September 24, 1995 – February 21, 1997)
Vor-Tech: Undercover Conversion Squad (1996)
Transformers: Beast Wars (1996–1999)
Sky Dancers (1996–1997)
All Dogs Go to Heaven: The Series (September 21, 1996 – November 6, 1998)
Enchanted Tales (1997–1998)
The Mr. Men Show (1997–1998)
Mummies Alive! (September 15 – November 25, 1997)
The New Adventures of Zorro (September 20, 1997 – December 12, 1998)
Van-Pires (1997–1998)
The Wacky World of Tex Avery (September 29, 1997 – December 2, 1997)
Hercules (August 31, 1998 – March 1, 1999) (Season 1 only)
The Lionhearts (September 19 – December 12, 1998)
Monkey Magic (1998–1999)
Pokémon (1998–1999) (Season 1 only)
RoboCop: Alpha Commando (1998–1999)
Voltron: The Third Dimension (1998–2000)

2000s
Tama and Friends (2001–2002)
Poochini's Yard (2002–2003)
Sabrina's Secret Life (2003–2004)
Trollz (2005-2006)
Strawberry Shortcake (2006–2007)
VeggieTales (2006–2009)

See also
Weekday cartoon

Notes

References

Syndication